David Dewitt Williams (born 4 November 1963) is a former West Indian cricketer who played in 11 Tests and 36 ODIs from 1988 to 1998.

A diminutive man, at 5 foot 4, Williams struggled to grab Jeff Dujon's place in the international side not least because of his inability to contribute the weight of runs Dujon managed. Compared to Dujon's Test batting average of 31.94, Williams achieved just 13.44, with just one score of 50 or more, that was a 65 against England in 1998 which helped them to a three wicket win in Trinidad. However three consecutive ducks followed that innings and he was dropped for the final test of the series.

Williams played 71 first class matches for Trinidad and Tobago between 1983 and 1999 averaging 22.31, with 151 catches and 39 stumpings, his highest score was 112.

Williams was appointed to the role of assistant coach to the West Indies team in 2007 prior to the first World Twenty20 World Championships. He made a surprise return to the field in March 2009, during the final day of the fourth Test against England in Barbados, where he enthusiastically undertook the role of substitute fielder.

References

External links
 

1963 births
Living people
West Indies Test cricketers
West Indies One Day International cricketers
Trinidad and Tobago cricketers
Trinidad and Tobago cricket coaches
Cricketers at the 1992 Cricket World Cup
Wicket-keepers